Vilnis Ezerins is a former running back in the National Football League. He was drafted in the eighth round of the 1966 NFL Draft by the Los Angeles Rams and later played with the team during the 1968 NFL season.

References

Soviet emigrants to the United States
People from Union Grove, Wisconsin
Sportspeople from the Milwaukee metropolitan area
Los Angeles Rams players
American football running backs
Wisconsin–Whitewater Warhawks football players
American people of Latvian descent
1944 births
Living people
Latvian World War II refugees